Vespella de Gaià is a municipality in the province of Tarragona, Catalonia, Spain.

The parish church is in Romanesque style, and houses a 1579 retablo.

References

External links
 Government data pages 

Municipalities in Tarragonès
Populated places in Tarragonès